Thiru Vikram (born July 25, 1995) is an inventor, engineer and entrepreneur, who is the CEO of Buffalo Automation, an artificial intelligence company headquartered in Buffalo, New York, that provides autonomous navigation technology for commercial ships and recreational boats.

Early life and career 
Vikram attended the Lawrence School, Lovedale in Ootacamund, Tamil Nadu, India. Vikram was a Headboy and a member of the Robotics Club at Lovedale.

He studied computer science and electrical engineering at the University at Buffalo School of Engineering and Applied Sciences where he co-founded Buffalo Automation with Alexander Zhitelzeyf and Emilie Reynolds, who were fellow engineering students at the university. The company was initially founded to design and build an artificial intelligence system that enables ships and boats to self-navigate. In 2015, Vikram left the University at Buffalo to focus on the company full-time.

Vikram is a Dravidian Indian-American originally from Tamil Nadu in South India, and is a Hindu.

Vikram serves in the US Army Reserve as a combat engineer.

Awards 
Vikram was awarded first place in the 2018 Entrepreneurs' Organization Global Student Entrepreneurship Awards Western NY Competition.

In 2021, Vikram was recognized as a CSE Distinguished Junior Alumni by the University at Buffalo.

In 2022, Vikram was featured as one of the United States’ 18 Top CEO’s in the Assistive Technology Startup Space and among the top 44 in Navigation by Boardroom Media.

Inventions 
Vikram is listed as an inventor in a few patents related to autonomous navigation technology. These include a sensor system for maritime vessels, a deep learning intelligent sensing system integration, training a deep learning system for maritime applications, a deep learning intelligent sensing system for port operations, and a lane and object detection systems and methods.

References 

American engineers
1995 births
Living people